Jack Andrew is a British rugby union player for Cornish Pirates. He went to Exeter Chiefs from their academy in the summer of 2010. He joined the pirates in the summer 2013 His position of choice is Prop. Jack attended The Roseland Community College in Tregony, Cornwall until 2007 where he then joined Truro College.

References

External links

 Academy Players Enjoy Promotion Too

English rugby union players
Exeter Chiefs players
Living people
Plymouth Albion R.F.C. players
Rugby union players from Cornwall
Year of birth missing (living people)
Rugby union props